Anastasija (Serbian and Macedonian: Анастасија) is a transliteration of the Greek name Anastasia in Serbian, Macedonian, and Latvian. Its male counterpart is Anastasije' (Serbian: Анастасије). It may refer to:

Saint Anastasija (fl. 1166–1196), Serbian Queen
Anastasija Babović (born 2000), Montenegrin handball player
Anastasija Grigorjeva (b. 1990), Latvian wrestler
Anastasija Grišanina (born 1996), Lithuanian rhythmic gymnast
Anastasija Khmelnytska (born 1997), German rhythmic gymnast
Anastasija Reiberger (b. 1977), Russian-born German pole vaulter
Anastasija Sevastova (b. 1990), Latvian tennis player
Anastasija Zolotic (born 2002), American taekwondo athlete
Anastasia (band) (est. 1990), Macedonian electronic music

See also 

Anastacia (given name)
Anastasia
Anastasiia
Anastasiya
Annastasia

Serbian feminine given names
Macedonian feminine given names
Latvian feminine given names